Rinconada may refer to:
Rinconada, a city and commune in the Los Andes Province of central Valparaíso Region, Chile. 
Rinconada Department, a department in the province of Jujuy in the Argentina.
Rinconada, Jujuy, a municipality in Jujuy Province in Argentina.
Rinconada Llicuar District, a district of the province Sechura in Peru.
Rinconada Bikol language, a language of the Philippines
Casa Rinconada, a Chacoan Anasazi archaeological site located in Chaco Culture National Historical Park, northwestern New Mexico, United States.

See also
La Rinconada (disambiguation)